The Ho Tram Open was a golf tournament on the Asian Tour. It was played only once, from 3–6 December 2015 at The Bluffs Ho Tram Strip, in Phước Thuận, Vietnam. Sergio García won the event in a playoff.

The renamed Ho Tram Players Championship was scheduled to become the Asian Tour's flagship event in 2017, but was postponed due to ongoing building work at the host venue. It was again scheduled to be played in 2018 and 2019, but was never held.

Winners

References

External links
Coverage on the Asian Tour's official site

Former Asian Tour events
Golf in Vietnam